Thomas L. Haskell (1939 – July 12, 2017) was an American historian. He joined the faculty of Rice University in 1970, and was the Samuel G. McCann Professor of History.

Born in 1939, Haskell earned a bachelor's degree from Princeton University in 1961. He began teaching at Rice University in 1970 and obtained his doctorate from Stanford University in 1973. Haskell received a Guggenheim Fellowship in 1986. He was named professor emeritus in 2009 and died at the age of 78 in 2017, due to complications of Alzheimer's disease.

References

Further reading

External links
Thomas L. Haskell at Rice University - Page now defunct - view archived page at Archive.org

1939 births
2017 deaths
Neurological disease deaths in the United States
20th-century American historians
American male non-fiction writers
21st-century American historians
21st-century American male writers
Rice University faculty
Stanford University alumni
Princeton University alumni
20th-century American male writers